Trechosia is a genus of beetles in the family Carabidae, containing the following species:

 Trechosia aberdarensis Jeannel, 1935
 Trechosia ambigua (Peringuey, 1896)
 Trechosia aterrima (Peringuey, 1896)
 Trechosia dollmani Jeannel, 1960
 Trechosia intermedia Geginat, 2007
 Trechosia kogelbergensis Geginat, 2007
 Trechosia leleupi Jeannel, 1964
 Trechosia monticola (Peringuey, 1926)
 Trechosia montistabulae Jeannel, 1964
 Trechosia natalensis Jeannel, 1960
 Trechosia solutilis (Peringuey, 1908)

References

Trechinae